Flaxman Charles John Spurrell  (8 September 1842 – 25 February 1915) was a British archaeologist, geologist and photographer who worked mainly in Kent and East Anglia. He was also a noted egyptologist, working closely with Flinders Petrie.

Family and early life
Born at Mile End in Stepney, London, Spurrell was the eldest son of Dr. Flaxman and Ann Spurrell and a descendant of the Spurrell family of Norfolk. He was a nephew of the Rev. Frederick Spurrell, a fellow archaeologist, and an uncle of the biologist and author Herbert George Flaxman Spurrell.

Not long after his birth, the family settled at Bexley in Kent, living for many years at The Priory, Picardy Road, Belvedere (later home to the Priory Conservative Club).

Spurrell was educated at Epsom College and went on to study medicine, although he never completed his studies.

Archaeological work
By the late 1850s Spurrell had developed an interest in archaeology and geology in the North Kent area and was encouraged to pursue his interest by his father, who had been a founding member of both the Kent Archaeological Society and the West Kent Natural History, Microscopical and Photographic Society. He began to examine flint implements in and around Crayford and was, according to Nesta Caiger, “the first archaeologist to study fully the many deneholes which were dug in Kent and Essex”, many of which he descended into, examined and photographed. He visited and investigated dozens of other sites, including prehistoric and Roman sites on both sides of the Thames estuary.

He published his findings in the periodicals of the Kent Archaeological Society, the Essex Archaeological Society and the Royal Archaeological Society, as well as those of other societies and groups.

In the 1870s Spurrell met Flinders Petrie, becoming a trusted friend and collaborator. Over the following decades his attention turned increasingly to egyptology.  While Petrie was unable to convince Spurrell to travel to Egypt with him, the objects that Petrie sent back to England were careful studied and catalogued by Spurrell, including important items discovered at Naqada and Tell el-Amarna.

In 1885 and 1889 Spurrell published his theory about the origins of the river Thames' vernacular embankments, described as a "startling suggestion" since shown to be probably correct.

In 1895 he presented a number of prehistoric artefacts to the Natural History Museum in London and later donated material from his personal collection to the museum at Norwich Castle. Some of his photographic images are now held by the Historic England Archive.

Later life and recognition
Shortly after his mother’s death in 1896, Spurrell retired to Norfolk, where he resided first with his uncle Daniel Spurrell at the Manor House in Bessingham and later at The Den, another house on the estate. Despite what Petrie called “the entreaties of his friends”, he seldom left Norfolk and his self-imposed retirement.

On 27 March 1912 he married his cousin Katherine Anne Spurrell (1852–1919), a daughter of Daniel Spurrell and a noted daffodil breeder whose cultivars had won the Award of Merit from the Royal Horticultural Society.

Spurrell was a Fellow of the Geological Society from 1868 to 1905 and a Fellow of the Society of Antiquaries from 1899 to about 1910.

When a housing estate was built at Joyden's Wood in Bexley in the 1950s, one of the roads was named Spurrell Avenue in his honour.

Publications 
The following papers were published by F. C. J. Spurrell in the Royal Archaeological Society's Archaeological Journal:

Implements and Chips from the floor of a Palaeolithic Workshop, Vol. XXXVII
Deneholes and Artificial Caves with Vertical Entrances, Vol. XXXVIII
Shallow Pits in Norfolk and Elsewhere, Vol. XL
Early Sites and Embankments on the margins of the Thames Estuary, Vol. XLII
The First Passage of the Thames by Aulus Plautius, Vol. XLVII
Shoebury Camp, Essex, Vol. XLVII
Notes on a Boat found at Albert Dock, Woolwich, Vol. XLVII
Rude Implements from the North Downs, Vol. XLVIII
Some Flints from Egypt of the IVth Dynasty, Vol. XLIX
Notes on Early Sickles, Vol. XLIX
On Remedies in the Sloane Collections, and on Alchemical Symbols, Vol. LI
Notes on Egyptian Colours, Vol. LII
On Some Flint Implements from Egypt and Denmark, Vol. LIII

In Archaeologia Cantiana, the journal of the Kent Archaeological Society, he published:

Palaeolithic Implements found in West Kent, Vol. XV
Sketch of the Ancient Architecture of Erith Church, Kent, Vol. XVI
Dartford Antiquities. Notes on British Roman and Saxon Remains there found, Vol. XVIII

Flaxman Spurrell also published the following articles in the Essex Naturalist:

Ensilage, or preserving grain in pits (1887)
Withambury (1887)
Danbury Camp, Essex (1890)
Hæsten's Camps at Shoebury and Benfleet, Essex (1890)

In the Proceedings of the Geologists' Association he published the following works:

Excursion to Erith and Crayford, Vol. IX
On the Estuary of the Thames and its Alluvium, Vol. XI
Excursion to Higham, Vol. XI
Excursion to Crayford, Vol. XI
Excursion to Swanscombe, Vol XI
Excursion to Grays, Thurrock, Essex, Vol. XII
Excursion to Dartford Heath, Vol. XIII
See also Visit to see F. C. J. Spurrell's collection of fossils in Excursion to Belvedere, J. Morris, Vol. II

The following was published in the Quarterly Journal of the Geological Society:

 

In the Journal of the Anthropological Institute can be found:

On some Palaeolithic knapping tools and methods of using them, Vol. XIII

The following appeared in the Reports of the West Kent Natural History, Microscopical and Photographic Society:

A sketch of the history of the rivers and denudation of West Kent (1886)

References

External links

English archaeologists
English Egyptologists
19th-century British geologists
Photographers from Kent
People educated at Epsom College
1842 births
1915 deaths
Fellows of the Society of Antiquaries of London